Mesospora is a genus of macroalgae that was described by Anna Weber-van Bosse in 1911. Although considered a taxonomic synonym of Hapalospongidion, the World Register of Marine Species cites six accepted species of the genus.

Description
Mesospora is characterized as a crustose brown macroalga with a saxicolous habitat, gelatinous crustose thallus, adherent to the substrate without rhizoids, several cells thick basal layer, unbranched erect free filaments, intercalary plurilocular reproductive structures uniseriate or biseriate and unilocular reproductive structures stalked and borne laterally at base of erect vegetative filaments.

Mesospora is said to be morphologically similar to Diplura. Their difference lies in the number of chloroplasts per cell. The Mesospora has a single chloroplast per cell, a one-celled sterile tip of the erect filament and unilocular sporangia, while the Diplura has several chloroplasts per cell and lacks unilocular sporangia.

Species
Species according to WoRMS as of April 17, 2022.
Mesospora elongata S.W.Poong, P.E.Lim & S.M.Phang, 2013
Mesospora indopacifica S.-W.Poong, P.-E.Lim & S-M.Phang, 2017
Mesospora lombokensis S.-W.Poong, P.-E.Lim & S.-M.Phang, 2017
Mesospora negrosensis J.A.West & H.P.Calumpong, 1996
Mesospora pangoensis (Setchell) Chihara & J.Tanaka, 1982
Mesospora pangoensis var. galapagensis (Setchell & Gardner) Chihara & J.Tanaka, 1982
Mesospora schmidtii Weber-van Bosse, 1911

References

Ralfsiales
Brown algae genera